Leucania palaestinae is a species of moth of the family Noctuidae. It is found from Algeria to Egypt, Sicily, Cyprus, Greece, Turkey, Israel, Syria, Jordan, the Sinai in Egypt, Iran, Iraq and Turkmenistan.

Adults are on wing from April to June and from October to December. There are two generation per year.

The larvae feed on Arundo phraguntes and Gramineae species in Europe.

External links
 Hadeninae of Israel

Leucania
Moths of Europe
Moths of Asia
Moths of the Middle East